Cables' Vision is a studio album by jazz pianist George Cables, released in 1980 by Contemporary Records and featuring trumpeter Freddie Hubbard.

Reception
The Allmusic review by Scott Yanow stated "This logically conceived and well-paced set is a gem that is highly recommended".

Track listing
All compositions by George Cables except where noted.

"Morning Song" - 6:55
"I Told You So" - 9:05
"Byrdlike" (Hubbard) - 8:58
"Voodoo Lady" - 6:18
"The Stroll" (Hutcherson) - 4:33
"Inner Glow" - 5:43

Personnel
George Cables - piano, electric piano
Freddie Hubbard - flugelhorn
Bobby Hutcherson - vibraphone
Ernie Watts - tenor saxophone (2, 3, 6), flute (4)
Tony Dumas - bass, electric bass (1)
Peter Erskine - drums
Vince Charles - percussion (2, 4, 6)

References

George Cables albums
1980 albums
Contemporary Records albums